Ramiro Guerra Pereyra (born 21 March 1997) is an Uruguayan footballer who plays as a central midfielder.

Club career
Born in Montevideo to a Spanish mother and an Uruguayan father, Guerra moved to Spain before his second birthday, and subsequently joined Villarreal CF's youth setup. He made his senior debut on 3 May 2014 at the age of 17, starting in a 1–2 Segunda División B home loss against Gimnàstic de Tarragona.

Guerra was promoted to the C-team ahead of the 2014–15 campaign, and scored his first senior goal on 7 December 2014 in a 2–4 home loss against UD Benigànim in the Tercera División. He made his first-team debut on 28 September, starting in a 0–0 away draw against Maccabi Tel Aviv in the season's UEFA Europa League.

Guerra made his La Liga debut on 1 October 2017, coming on as a late substitute for Samu Castillejo in a 3–0 home win against SD Eibar. The following 21 August, he moved to Segunda División side Gimnàstic de Tarragona on loan for the season.

Career statistics

Club

References

External links

1997 births
Living people
Footballers from Montevideo
Uruguayan footballers
Uruguay under-20 international footballers
Spanish footballers
Spain youth international footballers
Uruguayan people of Spanish descent
Spanish people of Uruguayan descent
Association football midfielders
La Liga players
Segunda División players
Segunda División B players
Tercera División players
Villarreal CF C players
Villarreal CF B players
Villarreal CF players
Gimnàstic de Tarragona footballers